Franko Nakić (born June 9, 1972) is a Croatian-Greek retired professional basketball player. Under his Greek nationality, he is known by the name of Franko Nakits.

Early life
Nakić was born in Šibenik, to his father, Mile Nakić, who is a Croatian sportsman and water polo coach. He moved to Greece to live, and gained Greek citizenship.

Professional career
Nakić started his career with Olympiacos. He played with Olympiacos from 1992 to 1998, winning 5 Greek League championships (1993, 1994, 1995, 1996, 1997) and 2 Greek Cups (1994, 1997). In 1997, Nakić won the EuroLeague championship, Greek League championship, and the Greek Cup all in the same season, thus winning the coveted Triple Crown. He also participated at two EuroLeague Finals (1994 Tel Aviv, 1995 Saragoza) and at the 1997 McDonald's Championship final against the Chicago Bulls of Michael Jordan.

In 1998, he moved to Alba Berlin, and with Alba, he won the German League championship and the German Cup in the year 1999. After the 1998-99 season, he returned to Olympiacos.

In 2000, he moved to the Greek club Iraklis. He also played for the Greek club Aris, Near East, the Italian League club Basket Livorno, and the Greek clubs Peristeri, Olympia Larissa, and Kolossos Rodou.

References

External links 
FIBA SuproLeague Profile
Italian League Profile 

1972 births
Living people
Alba Berlin players
Aris B.C. players
Greek men's basketball players
Greek Basket League players
Iraklis Thessaloniki B.C. players
Kolossos Rodou B.C. players
Near East B.C. players
Olympiacos B.C. players
Olympia Larissa B.C. players
Peristeri B.C. players
Small forwards
Basketball players from Šibenik